The 2022–23 Four Hills Tournament, part of the 2022–23 FIS Ski Jumping World Cup, took place at the four traditional venues of Oberstdorf, Garmisch-Partenkirchen, Innsbruck and Bischofshofen, located in Germany and Austria, between 28 December 2022 and 6 January 2023. It was the 71st edition of the event.

Schedule

Results

Oberstdorf
 HS137 Arena Oberstdorf, Germany
29 December 2022

Garmisch-Partenkirchen
 HS142 Große Olympiaschanze, Germany
1 January 2023

Innsbruck
 HS128 Bergiselschanze, Austria
4 January 2023

Bischofshofen
 HS142 Paul-Ausserleitner-Schanze, Austria
6 January 2023

Overall standings

The final standings after all four events:

References

External links 
 

2022-23
2022 in ski jumping
2023 in ski jumping
2022 in German sport
2023 in German sport
2023 in Austrian sport
December 2022 sports events in Germany
January 2023 sports events in Germany
January 2023 sports events in Austria